Teucrium chamaedrys, the wall germander, is a species of plant native to the Mediterranean regions of Europe and North Africa, and the Middle East as far as Iran.   It was historically used as a medicinal herb for the treatment of gout and sometimes as a component of Venice treacle.
It’s also used as an  ornamental.

Subspecies
 Teucrium chamaedrys subsp. albarracinii (Pau) Rech.f. - France, Spain
 Teucrium chamaedrys subsp. algeriense Rech.f. - Algeria
 Teucrium chamaedrys subsp. chamaedrys - central + southern Europe, Caucasus, Turkey, Iran
 Teucrium chamaedrys subsp. germanicum (F.Herm.) Rech.f. - France, Germany
 Teucrium chamaedrys subsp. gracile (Batt.) Rech.f. - Algeria,  Morocco
 Teucrium chamaedrys subsp. lydium O.Schwarz - Greece, Turkey
 Teucrium chamaedrys var. multinodum Bordz. - Caucasus
 Teucrium chamaedrys subsp. nuchense (K.Koch) Rech.f. - Caucasus
 Teucrium chamaedrys subsp. olympicum Rech.f. - Greece
 Teucrium chamaedrys subsp. pectinatum Rech.f. - France, Italy
 Teucrium chamaedrys subsp. pinnatifidum (Sennen) Rech.f. - France, Spain
 Teucrium chamaedrys subsp. sinuatum (Celak.) Rech.f. - Iran, Iraq, Turkey
 Teucrium chamaedrys subsp. syspirense (K.Koch) Rech.f. - Crimea, Caucasus, Turkey, Iran, Turkmenistan
 Teucrium chamaedrys subsp. tauricola Rech.f. - Turkey, Syria
 Teucrium chamaedrys subsp. trapezunticum Rech.f. - Caucasus, Turkey

Appearance
Wall germander is a creeping evergreen perennial 6–18 inches tall.  Its scalloped, opposite leaves are 0.5–1.5 inches long, dark green, and shiny.  In late summer, tubular flowers grow in whorls from the leaf axils.

Cultivation
Wall germander can be grown in USDA Zones 5–10.  It may be propagated by vegetative cuttings or by the division of established clumps.

Gallery

References

External links
 Teucrium chamaedrys, Missouri Botanical Garden
 Teucrium chamaedrys, Plants for a Future database
 Teucrium chamaedrys, University of Arizona Pima County Cooperative Extension, Tucson Arizona USA

chamaedrys
Plants described in 1753
Flora of North Africa
Flora of Western Asia
Flora of Europe
Garden plants
Medicinal plants
Taxa named by Carl Linnaeus